The Shin-Takasegawa Pumped Storage Station (新高瀬川発電所) uses the Takase River (a tributary of the Shinano River) to operate a pumped storage hydroelectric scheme about  west of Ōmachi in Nagano Prefecture, Japan. Part of the system is within Chūbu-Sangaku National Park.

Construction on the complex began in 1971, concluded in 1978 and the power station was commissioned in 1980.
It is also the second tallest dam in Japan, next to Kurobe Dam.

Design and operation

When energy demand is low and therefore electricity less expensive, the turbines reverse and pump water from the lower reservoir back into the upper reservoir. This process repeats depending upon energy demand and water availability. Water released from the lower reservoir is used to power the Nakanosawa Power Station which uses  of hydraulic head to power a single  Francis turbine generator. It was commissioned in May 1980.

Takase Dam
The Takase Reservoir has a  capacity of which only  is active (or "useful") for power generation. The low active capacity of the reservoir is due to the high levels of silt in the Takase River which cause the reservoir to reserve 79 percent of its capacity for this purpose. During operation, the upper reservoir only draws down .

During periods of high energy demand, water from the Takase Reservoir is released down to the power station. At the power station, the water operates four  reversible Francis turbine-generators before being discharged into the lower reservoir, created by the Nanakura Dam.

Nanakura Dam
To protect in against rapid draw-down in water levels (as much as ), the top of the dam is coated in hard rock materials.

See also

Ōmachi Dam - located downstream
List of pumped-storage hydroelectric power stations
List of tallest dams in the world
Hida Mountains
Chūbu-Sangaku National Park

References

External links

Shin-Takasegawa Power Station at TEPCO

Dams in Nagano Prefecture
Pumped-storage hydroelectric power stations in Japan
Ōmachi, Nagano
Chūbu-Sangaku National Park
Energy infrastructure completed in 1980
Underground power stations